"Chains" is a Hip hop song by New Zealand DJ DLT featuring singer Che Fu. The song reached no 1 on the New Zealand charts. It was Che-Fu's first song after leaving Supergroove and marked the beginning of his solo career.

Background
Che-Fu had been asked to feature on the song before his departure from Supergroove. He came to the recording unaware that he needed to write a chorus as well as a verse, and came up with the memorable hook "Come break my chains/Come help me out/Living in the city ain't so bad" on the spot.

The lyrics indirectly address the French nuclear testing at the Mururoa islands.

Chart performance
The song debuted on the New Zealand charts at number 2, then rose to number 1 where it remained for 5 weeks.

Year-end charts

Awards
At the 1997 New Zealand Music Awards 'Chains' won Best Single, and Che-Fu was awarded Best Male Vocalist for the song. In 2001 it was named by APRA members as the 21st best NZ song of all time, and featured on the Nature's Best album.

References

External links
 Chains on NZ on Screen

1996 singles
APRA Award winners
Number-one singles in New Zealand
DLT (musician) songs
1996 songs